Latrodectus corallinus is a species of widow spider native to Argentina.

Distribution and habitat 
Latrodectus corallinus is native to Argentina. It is found both outdoors and indoors, and is commonly found in agricultural fields.

Habits
Latrodectus corallinus, like most species of Latrodectus, is not aggressive. The peak time of activity for Latrodectus corallinus is between the months of December and March (summer in the Southern Hemisphere).

References

External links
Underside of Latrodectus corallinus (Good view of square-like ring on underside of abdomen.)

corallinus
Spiders of Argentina
Spiders described in 1980
Taxa named by Jorge Washington Ábalos